Wesley Koolhof and Matwé Middelkoop were the defending champions but chose not to defend their title.

Philipp Petzschner and Tim Pütz won the title after defeating Guido Andreozzi and Kenny de Schepper 6–7(3–7), 6–2, [10–8] in the final.

Seeds

Draw

References
 Main Draw

Open du Pays d'Aix - Doubles
2018 Doubles